Alexanders Run is a  long 1st order tributary to Harmon Creek in Brooke County, West Virginia.  This is the only stream of this names in the United States.

Course
Alexanders Run rises at Weirton Heights, West Virginia, and then flows south-southwest to join Harmon Creek about 1 mile northwest of Colliers.

Watershed
Alexanders Run drains  of area, receives about 40.0 in/year of precipitation, has a wetness index of 339.87, and is about 59% forested.

See also
List of rivers of West Virginia

References

Rivers of West Virginia
Rivers of Brooke County, West Virginia